The Natural History Museum at the University of Oslo (NHM) is Norway's oldest and largest museum of natural history. It is situated in the neighborhood of Tøyen in Oslo, Norway.

It traces its roots to the University Botanical Garden, which was founded near Tøyen Manor in 1814. Museums for zoology, botany and geology were added approximately a hundred years later, when the university campus in central Oslo had become too small for such purposes.
 Major proponents were Waldemar Christofer Brøgger and Nordal Wille. For most of the twentieth century the museums and botanical garden were organized in five different entities; these were merged on 1 August 1999. The current name dates from 2005.

The Zoological Museum displaying wildlife from Norway as well as the rest of the world. The Botanical Garden  contains 35,000 plants,   7,500 species and two exhibition greenhouses. The Geological Museum contain research material of more than 2 million fossils, rock specimens and minerals. A selection of specimens are on display in both the Geological Museum and the Zoological Museum. Among the attractions is the Darwinius masillae fossil "Ida", a primate from the Eocene Epoch.

Gallery

References

External links

 Official site (English)
 Panorames from the exhibits

Museums in Oslo
Natural history museums in Norway
University of Oslo
University museums in Norway